Staten Islandfrom Dutch names meaning "Island of the States General"is a borough of New York City in the United States.

Staten Island may also refer to:

Places
 Staten Island, California, a riverine island northeast of Stockton in the United States
 Isla de los Estados, also known as "Staten Island", an island off Tierra del Fuego, Argentina
 Staten Landt, Abel Tasman's original name for New Zealand
 Staten Island, a large phantom island placed north of Japan by Maarten Gerritsz Vries now believed to be a garbled account of Iturup, one of the Kurils in the North Pacific

Other uses
 Staten Island, a 2009 film by James DeMonaco
 USCGC Staten Island (WAGB-278), a former United States Coast Guard icebreaker

See also
 Generality Lands, lands directly controlled by the States General of the Seven Provinces of the Netherlands
 The King of Staten Island, a 2020 film by Judd Apatow